Jorge Gonzalo Laborda (born 13 January 1995) is an Argentine professional footballer who plays as a goalkeeper.

Career
Laborda began his youth career with Independiente at the age of thirteen, which preceded further stints with Banfield and Sarmiento. Guillermo Brown signed the goalkeeper on 31 July 2016. He was an unused substitute for fixtures with Douglas Haig, Villa Dálmine and Atlético Paraná in mid-June 2017, prior to making his professional bow on 24 June versus Brown after coming on at the interval for Andrés Mehring. Another appearance followed a month later against Boca Unidos as they placed third; missing promotion by two points. In January 2020, Laborda headed to Wales to sign with Cymru North side Bangor City.

In August 2020, after eight months with Bangor, Laborda left to sign terms with Sambenedettese of Italy's Serie C. After appearing as an unused substitute for twenty-five matches in all competitions across the next six months, Laborda eventually made his debut for Samb in Serie C on 21 February by playing the full duration of a 4–1 away loss against Modena. He featured again a week later in a 4–0 defeat at home to Südtirol; he replaced Tommaso Nobile, who had been sent off at 0–0.

Career statistics
.

References

External links

1995 births
Living people
Sportspeople from Buenos Aires Province
Argentine footballers
Association football goalkeepers
Argentine expatriate footballers
Expatriate footballers in Wales
Expatriate footballers in Italy
Argentine expatriate sportspeople in Wales
Argentine expatriate sportspeople in Italy
Primera Nacional players
Cymru North players
Serie C players
Guillermo Brown footballers
Bangor City F.C. players
A.S. Sambenedettese players